Katarina Srebotnik and Ai Sugiyama were the defending champions, but Srebotnik chose not to participate this year due to injury.

Ai Sugiyama partnered with Daniela Hantuchová, but lost in the first round to Petra Martić and Coco Vandeweghe.

Seeds

Draw

Finals

Top half

Bottom half

External links
 Draw

Sony Ericsson Open - Women's Doubles
2009 Sony Ericsson Open